Jimbour East is a rural locality in the Western Downs Region, Queensland, Australia. In the  Jimbour East had a population of 199 people. The town of Jimbour in the locality.

Geography 
Jimbour East is relatively flat farming land (elevation 350–450 metres).

Road infrastructure
The Dalby–Jandowae Road (State Route 82) runs along the western boundary and passes through part of the western portion.

History
The town name was first used by 1841 by Henry Dennis for his Jimbour pastoral run, with the apparent meaning of either "sheep" or "good grass" in an unrecorded Aboriginal language. In 1877,  of land was resumed from the Jimbour pastoral run to establish smaller farms. The land was offered for selection on 24 April 1877.

Jimbour Provisional School opened on 9 September 1873. On 14 November 1916 it became Jimbour State School. During 1922 and 1923 it became a half-time school (meaning a single teacher was shared between two schools) in conjunction with Spring Flat State School initially and then with Springfield Provisional School. It resumed as a full time school in 1923 but then closed on 31 December 1925.  It reopened on 29 September 1931 as Jimbour Provisional School. On 2 June 1933 it returned to State School status.

Jimbour Post Office opened on 1 September 1882.

The Jimbour Memorial Hall is the second such building on that site, the first having blown down in a severe storm in 1949.

In the  Jimbour East had a population of 185 people.

In the  Jimbour East had a population of 199 people.

Amenities
Facilities in the town include a primary school, a post office, butchery and a town hall. Jimbour State School opened on 9 September 1873.

Heritage listings 
Jimbour East has a number of heritage-listed sites, including:
 Dalby-Jandowae Road: Jimbour Dry Stone Wall
 86-371 Jimbour-Malakoff Road: Jimbour Homestead

Education
Jimbour State School is a government primary (Prep-6) school for boys and girls at Dalby-Jandowae Road. In 2018, the school had an enrolment of 13 students with 2 teachers (1 full-time equivalent) and 4 non-teaching staff (2 full-time equivalent).

There is no secondary school in Jimbour East. The nearest secondary schools are Bell State School (to Year 10) in neighbouring Bell to the east, Jandowae State School (to Year 10) in Jandowae to the north-west, and Dalby State High School (to Year 12) in Dalby to the south.

References

External links 

 Town map of Jimbour, 1976

Western Downs Region
Localities in Queensland